Kerstin Birgitta Rasmusson, (4 September 1939 – 5 March 2021) was a Swedish television personality, baker and author of several cookbooks, some focused on cakes. Between 2012 and 2019, she was a judge on Hela Sverige bakar, which was broadcast on TV4. She reprised the role for its celebrity version.

Rasmusson died on 5 March 2021, at the age of 81.

Bibliography
2004 - Rasmusson Birgitta, red. Kokbok för dig som har diabetes: grundkokboken med recept för hela dagen. 
2004 - Rasmusson, Birgitta; Weiland Agneta, Svensson Ulf, Thell Göran. Mat med smak: 350 recept från Ica provkök : med inspiration från fem världsdelar. 
2011 - Rasmusson Birgitta, Paulsson Berit, red. Rutiga bakboken: [över 500 goda matbröd, vetebröd, mjuka kakor, småkakor, bakelser, tårtor och pajer]. 
2015 - Rasmusson Birgitta, Paulsson Berit, red. Rutiga kokboken: grundkokboken med över 1500 recept för stora och små hushåll. 
2016 - Rasmusson, Birgitta; Kleinschmidt Wolfgang. Birgittas bästa: favoritrecepten till det svenska fikat. 
2017 - Rasmusson, Birgitta; Pousette Ulrika. Birgittas bästa julkakor. 
2019 - Rasmusson, Birgitta; Svensson Ulf. Birgittas bästa - kakor vi minns.

References

External links 

1939 births
2021 deaths
Swedish television personalities
Women television personalities
Swedish food writers
Cookbook writers
Women cookbook writers
21st-century Swedish non-fiction writers
21st-century Swedish women writers
Swedish women non-fiction writers
People from Uddevalla Municipality